Rugby has been played in Sweden since 1933, the first full international being played in 1949 against Denmark.
The country celebrated its 75th anniversary in 2008.

Sweden has been a member union of World Rugby since 1988 and is one of the 48 members of Rugby Europe.

Sweden won Rugby Europe Division 2 in 2012 and Conference 1 North in 2022, beating the Czech Republic in the final league game of the season at Stockholm's Stadion, in front of more than 1,500 spectators, promoting them to the Rugby Europe Trophy.

The national side is ranked 41st in the world (as of March 1, 2023).

Current squad

This is the Sweden team selected to play in Split against Ukraine on March 18, 2023:

Leading Try Scorers

Rugby Europe Conference 1 North Champions 2021/22
2019 promoted side ↑   2019 relegated side ↓    WR = World Ranking May 2022

Rugby Europe Trophy Fixtures and Results 2022/23

Current League Table 2022/23 
2022 promoted sides ↑ WR = current World Ranking (Mar 15 2023)

As a result of Rugby Europe reorganisation the Trophy competition will be spread over 2 seasons, 22/23 and 23/24, before any promotion or relegation.

Results and Fixtures 

The following is a list of test matches since 2018, as well as any future test matches that have been officially scheduled.

Records of International Matches
A record of all international matches Sweden has played.

Honours
2012 Champions European Nations Cup Division 2 
2022 Champions Rugby Europe Conference 1 North

References

External links 

Teams in European Nations Cup (rugby union)
European national rugby union teams
Rugby union